The First National Bank Building in Steamboat Springs, Colorado was built in 1905.  It was listed on the National Register of Historic Places in 2001.

It is a rare local example of Romanesque Revival architecture.

References

Bank buildings on the National Register of Historic Places in Colorado
National Register of Historic Places in Routt County, Colorado
Romanesque Revival architecture in Colorado
Commercial buildings completed in 1905
1905 establishments in Colorado